Hunter Henry (born December 7, 1994) is an American football tight end for the New England Patriots of the National Football League (NFL). He played college football at Arkansas and was selected by the San Diego Chargers in the second round of the 2016 NFL Draft. Henry was a member of the Chargers for five seasons before joining the Patriots in 2021.

Early years
Henry was born in Little Rock, Arkansas on December 7, 1994, to Mark and Jenny Henry. In summer 2000, his family moved to the Atlanta area for his father's job. Henry moved back to Little Rock for his freshman year of high school where he attended Pulaski Academy in Little Rock for four years. As a freshman, Henry spent time playing offensive tackle, wide receiver, and defensive end for the football team. He would not play tight end during his high school career, due to the fact that Pulaski Academy's Spread Offense scheme did not feature the tight end position. Henry started his sophomore, junior, and senior year, winning a state championship with the Bruins in 2011.

Henry was named to the Parade All-American team for the 2012-13 school year and was one of the top recruits in the nation.

College career
In 2015, Henry was involved in one of the most memorable plays in Arkansas football history. During a fourth-and-25 play in overtime against Ole Miss in the rivalry game, Henry caught a pass from quarterback Brandon Allen and upon seeing that he was going to be tackled short of the first down marker, Henry blindly flung the ball backwards as a lateral to running back Alex Collins. Collins picked it up on the bounce and ran it for a 31-yard gain to gain a first down. This set up an eventual touchdown and successful two-point conversion to win the game. The uniqueness of the play led to widespread media coverage and replays. He was the John Mackey Award winner for best tight end in the nation and also was a Consensus All-American in the 2015–2016 season. Henry helped Arkansas win back-to-back bowl games in consecutive years for the first time in program history, beating former Southwest Conference rival the Texas Longhorns in the 2014 Texas Bowl, and winning the 2016 Liberty Bowl over the Kansas State Wildcats.

On January 4, 2016, Henry declared he would be entering the 2016 NFL Draft.

College statistics

Professional career

Pre-draft
In early 2016, Henry was predicted to be a late first- to second-round pick in the 2016 NFL Draft.  Henry skipped most physical drills at the NFL Combine but did compete in bench press with a position worst of 13 reps. Henry managed to improve on his pro day by posting a 4.67 40 yard dash and completing 21 reps in the bench press establishing himself as one of the top tight ends in the 2016 NFL Draft.

Henry was drafted by the San Diego Chargers in the second round (35th overall) of the 2016 NFL Draft. He was the first tight end to be selected in the 2016 NFL Draft. In addition, he was the first of five Arkansas Razorbacks to be selected that year.

San Diego / Los Angeles Chargers

2016 season
On June 2, 2016, Henry and the Chargers agreed to a four-year, $6.38 million contract with $3.98 million guaranteed and a $2.84 million signing bonus.

Henry entered training camp competing to be the backup tight end, against veterans Sean McGrath and Asante Cleveland. Henry was named the San Diego Chargers' third tight end on their depth chart to begin the regular season, behind longtime Pro-bowl veteran Antonio Gates and Sean McGrath.

In his NFL debut against the Kansas City Chiefs, Henry made one reception for 20 yards in the season-opening overtime loss. The following week, he earned his first NFL start during a victory over the Jacksonville Jaguars. During a Week 4 loss to the Saints, he caught four passes for 61 yards and scored his first NFL touchdown on a 20-yard pass from quarterback Philip Rivers. On October 13, 2016, Henry led all Chargers in receptions, making six catches for 83 yards and a touchdown in a 21–13 victory over the Denver Broncos. On December 18, he caught three passes for 37 receiving yards and a touchdown during a 19–16 loss to the Oakland Raiders. Henry has the distinction of catching the final touchdown of the Chargers' history in San Diego scoring a 12-yard touchdown in the fourth quarter of the 37-27 loss to Kansas City in the season finale.

In his rookie season, Henry scored the second-most touchdowns by a rookie tight end in the last decade (only behind Rob Gronkowski), and scored the fifth-most touchdowns by a rookie tight end in NFL history.

2017 season
During Week 15 against the Kansas City Chiefs, Henry left the game with a knee injury. The next day, it was revealed that he suffered a lacerated kidney and was placed on injured reserve on December 19, 2017. He finished the season with 45 receptions for 579 yards and four touchdowns.

2018 season
On May 22, 2018, Henry suffered a torn ACL during OTAs, and was ruled out for the entire season. On September 1, 2018, he was placed on the physically unable to perform list, giving Henry a chance to return later in the season. He was added to the active roster on January 7, 2019, ahead of their Divisional Round game, which they lost to the eventual Super Bowl LIII champion New England Patriots.

2019 season
On September 11, 2019, it was announced that Henry suffered a tibia plateau fracture to his left knee and would be out several weeks. Henry made his return from injury in Week 6 against the Pittsburgh Steelers. In that game, Henry caught eight passes for 100 yards and two touchdowns in the 24-17 loss. Overall, Henry finished the 2019 season with 55	receptions for 652 receiving yards and five receiving touchdowns.

2020 season
The Chargers placed the franchise tag on Henry on March 13, 2020. He signed the tag on April 16. He was placed on the reserve/COVID-19 list by the team on December 24, 2020, and activated on January 7, 2021. He finished the 2020 season with 60 receptions for 613 receiving yards and four receiving touchdowns.

New England Patriots

2021 season
On March 19, 2021, Henry signed a three-year, $37.5 million contract with the New England Patriots. He scored his first touchdown for the Patriots in Week 4 during a 17–19 home loss to the Tampa Bay Buccaneers. Over the first 10 games, Henry caught seven touchdown passes, establishing himself as a frequent red zone target for rookie quarterback Mac Jones. He finished the 2021 season with 50 receptions for 603 receiving yards and nine receiving touchdowns.

2022 season
Henry returned as the Patriots starting tight end in 2022. He finished the season with 41 catches for 509 yards and two touchdowns.

NFL career statistics

Personal life
Henry's parents are Mark Henry and Jenny Henry, and they live in Little Rock. His father was an offensive lineman for the Arkansas Razorbacks from 1987–1991.  He lettered four years for the Razorbacks. Henry has three siblings; Hayden, Hudson and Hope. Hayden was a linebacker at Arkansas from 2017-2022. Hudson is a redshirt junior tight end also at the University of Arkansas.

Henry was married on June 30, 2018. Hunter and his wife have one son.

Henry is a Christian. He has said, “I would say my faith is the most important thing to me. My dad is a pastor in Little Rock. I’ve grown up in a Christian background my whole life. My faith is the most important thing to me; that’s the one message that I want to convey to everybody.”

References

External links

 New England Patriots bio
 Arkansas Razorbacks bio

1994 births
Living people
All-American college football players
American football tight ends
Arkansas Razorbacks football players
Los Angeles Chargers players
New England Patriots players
Players of American football from Arkansas
San Diego Chargers players
Sportspeople from Little Rock, Arkansas
Ed Block Courage Award recipients